Majoritarianism is a political philosophy or ideology with the agenda asserting that a majority based on a religion, language, social class, or other category of the population, is entitled to a certain degree of primacy in society, and has the right to make decisions that affect the society. This traditional view has come under growing criticism, and liberal democracies have increasingly included constraints on what the parliamentary majority can do, in order to protect citizens' fundamental rights.

This should not be confused with the concept of a majoritarian electoral system, which is a simple electoral system that usually gives a majority of seats to the party with a plurality of votes. A parliament elected by this method may be called a majoritarian parliament (e.g., the Parliament of the United Kingdom, or the Parliament of India).

Under a democratic majoritarian political structure, the majority would not exclude any minority from future participation in the democratic process. Majoritarianism is sometimes pejoratively referred to by its opponents as "ochlocracy" or "tyranny of the majority". Majoritarianism is often referred to as majority rule, which may refer to a majority class ruling over a minority class, while not referring to the decision process called majority rule. It is a belief that the majority community should be able to rule a country in whichever way it wants.

Advocates of majoritarianism argue that majority decision making is intrinsically democratic and that any restriction on majority decision making is intrinsically undemocratic. If democracy is restricted by a constitution which cannot be changed by a simple majority decision, then yesterday's majority is being given more weight than today's. If it is restricted by some small group, such as aristocrats, judges, priests, soldiers, or philosophers, then society becomes an oligarchy. The only restriction acceptable in a majoritarian system is that a current majority has no right to prevent a different majority emerging in the future; this could happen, for example, if a minority persuades enough of the majority to change its position. In particular, a majority cannot exclude a minority from future participation in the democratic process. Majoritarianism does not prohibit a decision being made by representatives as long as this decision is made via majority rule, as it can be altered at any time by any different majority emerging in the future.

One critique of majoritarianism is that systems without supermajority requirements for changing the rules for voting can be shown to likely be unstable. Among other critiques of majoritarianism is that most decisions in fact take place not by majority rule, but by plurality, unless the voting system artificially restricts candidates or options to two only. In turn, due to Arrow's paradox, it is not possible to have Ranked voting systems with more than two options that retain adherence to both certain "fairness" criteria and rational decision-making criteria. Majoritarianism is often contrasted with Utilitarianism which can be achieved through Cardinal voting systems and avoids Arrow's paradox.

Types
Majoritarianism, as a concept of government, branches out into several forms. The classic form includes unicameralism and a unitary state.

Qualified majoritarianism is a more inclusionary form, with degrees of decentralization and federalism.

Integrative majoritarianism incorporates several institutions to preserve minority groups and foster moderate political parties.

History and legacy
There are relatively few instances of large-scale majority rule in recorded history, most notably the majoritarian system of Athenian democracy and other ancient Greek city-states. However, some argue that none of those Greek city-states were truly majority rule, particularly due to their exclusion of women, non-landowners, and slaves from decision-making processes. Most of the famous ancient philosophers staunchly opposed majoritarianism, because decisions based on the will of the uneducated and uninformed 'masses' are not necessarily wise or just. Plato is a prime example with his Republic, which describes a societal model based on a tripartite class structure.

Anarchist anthropologist David Graeber offers a reason as to why majority democratic government is so scarce in the historical record. "Majority democracy, we might say, can only emerge when two factors coincide: 1. a feeling that people should have equal say in making group decisions, and 2. a coercive apparatus capable of enforcing those decisions." Graeber argues that those two factors almost never meet: "Where egalitarian societies exist, it is also usually considered wrong to impose systematic coercion. Where a machinery of coercion did exist, it did not even occur to those wielding it that they were enforcing any sort of popular will."

Majoritarianism (as a theory), similar to democracy, has often been used as a pretext by sizable or aggressive minorities to politically oppress other smaller (or civically inactive) minorities, or even sometimes a civically inactive majority (see Richard Nixon's reference to the "Silent Majority" that he asserted supported his policies).

This agenda is most frequently encountered in the realm of religion: In essentially all Western nations, for instance, Christmas Day—and in some countries, other important dates in the Christian year as well—are recognized as legal holidays; plus a particular denomination may be designated as the state religion and receive financial backing from the government (examples include the Church of England in England and the Lutheran Church in the Scandinavian countries). Virtually all countries also have one or more official languages, often to the exclusion of some minority group or groups within that country who do not speak the language or languages so designated. In most cases, those decisions have not been made using a majoritarian referendum, and even in the rare case when a referendum has been used, a new majority is not allowed to emerge at any time and repeal it.

Reform and backlash

In recent times—especially beginning in the 1960s—some forms of majoritarianism have been countered by liberal reformers in many countries: in the 1963 case Abington School District v. Schempp, the United States Supreme Court declared that school-led prayer in the nation's public schools was unconstitutional, and since then many localities have sought to limit, or even prohibit, religious displays on public property. The movement toward greater consideration for the rights of minorities within a society is often referred to as pluralism.

This has provoked a backlash from some advocates of majoritarianism, who lament the Balkanization of society they claim has resulted from the gains made by the multicultural agenda; these concerns were articulated in a 1972 book, The Dispossessed Majority, written by Wilmot Robertson. Multiculturalists, in turn, have accused majoritarians of racism and xenophobia.

See also

Argumentum ad populum
Majoritarian democracy
Collectivism and individualism
Consensus decision-making
Consensus democracy
Direct democracy
Minoritarianism (opposite)
Minority rights
Popular democracy
Populism
Tyranny of the majority
Utilitarian ethics

References

Political theories
Majority–minority relations
Liberalism
Majority